Papi (Paupe; also known Baiyamo) is an alleged Sepik language spoken in East Sepik Province, Papua New Guinea. Glottolog leaves it unclassified.

It is spoken in the single village of Paupe in Tunap/Hunstein Rural LLG of East Sepik Province.

References

Papi–Asaba languages
Languages of East Sepik Province
Language isolates of New Guinea